Harber is a surname. Notable people with the surname include:

Aaron Harber, American talk show host
Anton Harber, South African journalist
Denzil Dean Harber (1909–1966), British Trotsykist and ornithologist
Giles B. Harber (1849–1925), United States Navy admiral
Jane Harber, Australian actress
John Harber (1889–1962), English cricketer

See also
Harber (DJ) (born 1997), American musician